Chrysauge eutelia is a species of snout moth in the genus Chrysauge. It was described by Herbert Druce in 1903. It is found in Brazil.

References

Moths described in 1903
Chrysauginae